Psaltodini is a tribe of cicadas in the family Cicadidae, found in Australia. There are at least 3 genera and about 17 described species in Psaltodini.

Genera
These three genera belong to the tribe Psaltodini:
 Anapsaltoda Ashton, 1921
 Neopsaltoda Distant, 1910
 Psaltoda Stål, 1861

References

Further reading

External links

 

 
Cicadinae
Hemiptera tribes